The Union Revolutionary Council, officially the Revolutionary Council of the Union of Burma or simply the Revolutionary Council (RC), was the supreme governing body of Burma (now Myanmar) from 2 March 1962, following the overthrow of U Nu's civilian government, to 3 March 1974, with the promulgation of the 1974 Constitution of Burma and transfer of power to the Pyithu Hluttaw (People's Assembly), the country's new unicameral legislature.

The Revolutionary Council's philosophical framework was laid in the Burmese Way to Socialism, which aspired to convert Burma into a self-sustaining democratic socialist state, on 30 April 1962. On 4 July 1962, the RC established the Burma Socialist Programme Party (BSPP), the country's only legal political party which Donald M. Seekins claims was modelled along the lines of a Marxist–Leninist revolutionary party. From 1962 to 1971, BSPP transitioned from a cadre party (consisting of elite RC affiliated members) into a mass party. In the First Congress, the party had 344,226 members. By 1981, BSPP had 1.5 million members.

Leadership
The Union Revolutionary Council was led by Ne Win, its chairman and 16 senior officers.

The founding members of the First Revolutionary Council, all of whom were military officers, are:

General Ne Win BC-3502 (Chief of General Staff)
Brigadier General Aung Gyi BC-5458 (Vice-Chief of General Staff) (Army)
Commodore Than Pe (died 1962) (Vice-Chief of General Staff) (Navy)
Brigadier General Thomas 'Tommy' Cliff (Vice-Chief of General Staff) (Air Force) (resigned 1964)
Brigadier General Tin Pe (resigned 1970) BC-3508 (Quartermaster General)
Colonel Than Sein BC-3574 (Colonel-General Staff)
Colonel Kyaw Soe (retired 1974) BC-3526 (Military Appointment General)
Colonel Chit Myaing (dismissed 1964) BC-3520 (Vice-Quartermaster General)
Colonel Khin Nyo (dismissed 1965) BC-3537 (Director General of Directorate of Military Training)
Colonel Hla Han (Director General of Directorate of Medical Services)
Brigadier General San Yu BC-3569 (Commander of Northern Military Command)
Brigadier General Sein Win BC-3525 (Commander of Central Military Command)
Colonel Thaung Kyi BC-3523 (Commander of Southeast Military Command)
Colonel Kyi Maung (sacked 1963) BC-3516 (Commander of Southwest Military Command)
Colonel Maung Shwe (resigned 1972) BC-3575 (Commander of Eastern Military Command)
Colonel Saw Myint (sacked 1964) BC-3518 (Administrator of Border Regions)
Colonel Tan Yu Sai (resigned 1968) BC-5090 (Vice-Commissioner of General of People's Police)

Revolutionary Government
The government formed by the Revolutionary Council of the Union of Burma was named Revolutionary Government of the Union of Burma or simply Revolutionary Government.

As wiping out the monarchist terms, a Ministry was called as a Department and a Minister was called as a Person in-charge of Department during the time of the Revolutionary Government.

The terms Ministry and Minister were restored when the Council of Ministers was formed in 8 May 1974.

Council member terms

References

Military history of Myanmar
Government of Myanmar
Military dictatorship in Myanmar
Socialism in Myanmar
Government agencies established in 1962
Government agencies disestablished in 1974
1962 establishments in Burma
1974 disestablishments in Burma